is a town on the banks of the River Lamme in the district of Hildesheim, in Lower Saxony, Germany.

Geography
The municipality includes the town itself, and 12 civil parishes (Ortsteile) which were incorporated in 1974:
 Bodenburg
 Breinum
 Detfurth
 Groß Düngen
 Klein Düngen
 Heinde
 Hockeln
 Lechstedt
 Listringen
 Östrum
 Wehrstedt
 Wesseln (Bad Salzdetfurth)

History
In 1194, Salzdetfurth was mentioned in a document for the first time. The place was devastated by fire or flood several times. The worst flood occurred in 1738 when 176 houses were destroyed. The word "Bad" meaning "spa" was added to the name in 1921. 
On 22 March 1945, during a heavy air raid on Hildesheim, Bad Salzderfurth was hit by several bombs and two houses in Goettingstrasse were destroyed.
Bad Salzdetfurth was officially awarded "town" status in 1949.

Each of the villages incorporated in 1974 has its own history and its own traditions.

Mayors 
Björn Gryschka (independent politician) was elected the new mayor in January 2019, succeeding Henning Hesse (SPD).

Sights 
There are various sights in the town itself and in each of the villages. There are many well-preserved half-timbered houses in the old town centre, such as the Miners' Guild Hall dating from 1898, and in the village of Wesseln. The Catholic Church of St. Gallus at Detfurth was built in a classicist style in the period 1772 to 1779. Other interesting village churches and chapels can be seen in Hockeln, Bodenburg, Breinum, Östrum, Wehrstedt and Klein Düngen. The Church of St. John the Baptist in Wesseln was built in a typical neogothic style in 1853-55.

The largest church in Bad Salzdetfurth itself is St. George's Church, a Protestant church with a painted wooden ceiling, which was built around 1700. In the west wall a mark, which is 3 metres above ground level, indicates the height of the flood waters of the River Lamme in 1738. The baroque altar dates from 1717. The organ, dating from 1590, originally stood in St. Lamberti, Hildesheim. There is a municipal museum dedicated to the mining history of Bad Salzdetfurth. Originally the brick building which now houses the museum was a school. The museum was founded in 1987.

The most modern church in Bad Salzdetfurth is the Catholic Holy Family Church which was built 1960-61 and consecrated on 3 September 1961. Its organ dates from 1979. Originally, very few Catholics lived in Bad Salzdetfurth. After the Second World War, however, many Catholic refugees from Silesia settled in the town.

Traffic connections 
Bad Salzdetfurth can be reached from Hildesheim by train. The railway station is in the middle of the town. There are railway halting places in the villages Bodenburg, Detfurth, Wesseln and Groß Düngen as well. On working days, there is at least one train per hour to and from Hildesheim. On Sundays and public holidays there is one train every two hours.

Photogallery

International relations

Bad Salzdetfurth is twinned with:
 Benicàssim, Spain
 Bochnia, Poland
 Yate, United Kingdom
 Kelbra, Germany

Personality

Sons and daughters of the town 
 Ulrike Rosenbach (born 1943), artist and art professor

Personalities who have worked locally 

 Joseph Müller (priest) (1894-1944), priest, Nazi opponent
 Gottfried von Cramm (1909-1976), tennis player
 Daniel van Buyten (born 1978), football player
 Katharina Schiller (born 1984), swimmer

In popular culture
It was mentioned in Tom Clancy's bestseller Red Storm Rising.

References

External links

  
 Bad Salzdetfurth News

 
Spa towns in Germany
Hildesheim (district)